Gernot Zippe (November 1917 – 7 May 2008) was an Austrian born German mechanical engineer who is widely credited with leading the team which developed the Zippe-type centrifuge, a centrifuge machine for the enrichment and collection of Uranium-235, during his time in the Soviet program of nuclear weapons.

Early life and World War II
Zippe was born in Varnsdorf, Austria-Hungary (nowadays Czech Republic) in 1917. Zippe studied and graduated with B.Sc. Physics at the University of Vienna in 1938, and served in the Luftwaffe as a flight instructor and a researcher on radar and airplane propellers. In 1941, Zippe received his B.S. in mechanical engineering, and M.Sc. in 1943 in the same  discipline. While doing his post doctoral research at the University of Vienna, Zippe participated in Germany's nuclear weapons project in the 1940s. He was the junior research team member of the isotope separation project led by Klaus Clusius at the Ludwig Maximilian University of Munich. In 1945, he was awarded a PhD in mechanical engineering with emphasizing on thermal column and its applicant physics. By the time Zippe fully joined the project as the team leader, Soviet special service kidnapped him, along with other technically skilled scientists and engineers, and imprisoned him in a special camp where he led a team that worked on centrifuge research for the Soviet Union. In the Soviet Union Zippe worked at the Physics Institute of Sukhumi on a centrifuge project, led by German director Manfred von Ardenne, and directed by another German scientist Max Steenbeck, whose theoretical achievements Zippe used. He was allowed to leave in 1956, and returned to Vienna.

When Zippe visited a 1957 conference on centrifuge research in Amsterdam, he realized the rest of the world was far behind what his team had been able to achieve. His notes had been confiscated when he left the Soviet Union, but working from memory, he was able to recreate the centrifuge at the University of Virginia in the United States.

United States offer
The United States government tried to recruit him for secret nuclear research, going so far as to ask him to change his citizenship, but he refused and returned to Europe.

Personal interests
Working in industry in the 1960s, he was able to improve the efficiency of the centrifuge. He enjoyed flying and flew planes until he was 80 years old.

Legacy
His invention made it cheaper to build nuclear reactors but also nuclear weapons, which increased the risk of nuclear proliferation. When asked if he has any regrets, he responded, "With a kitchen knife you can peel a potato or kill your neighbor, it's up to governments to use the centrifuge for the benefit of mankind."

Awards
Wilhelm Exner Medal (1990).

Other
In Hebrew, the name "Gernot Zippe" (גרנוט ציפה) is an anagram of the word "Centrifuge" (צנטריפוגה).

References

External links
 The Zippe Type – The Poor Man's Bomb, BBC Radio 4, 19 May 2004
 Tracking the technology, Nuclear Engineering International, 31 August 2004
 Slender and Elegant, It Fuels the Bomb, New York Times, March 23, 2004
 Gernot Zippe

2008 deaths
1917 births
Austrian mechanical engineers
Austrian nuclear physicists
Austrian people of World War II
World War II prisoners of war held by the Soviet Union
German Bohemian people
Austrian people of German Bohemian descent
Austrian expatriates in Switzerland
People from Varnsdorf
Nuclear program of Nazi Germany
Nuclear weapons program of the Soviet Union
20th-century Austrian engineers